The Bering Truck Corporation was an American manufacturer and distributor of trucks, headquartered in Front Royal, Virginia and Orange Walk, Belize. It distributed Hyundai-made trucks with American automotive components.

History

Established and founded in 1997 in Front Royal, Virginia, Bering Truck was the first new American truck manufacturer and distributor established in over 70 years. In partnership with Hyundai Motor Company of Korea, three classes of trucks were launched into the US market. The first trucks were sold in 1999 and in one year, Bering was the fastest growing US truck company having sold more than 1,400 trucks.

Bering was forced to cease operations in 2001 after its sole supplier entered into a relationship with Daimler-Chrysler and terminated the Bering agreements. Litigation ensued; in an international arbitration between Bering and Hyundai, the arbitration panel found (in 2004) that Hyundai had breached its agreements with Bering in bad faith. A federal antitrust case filed by Bering against Hyundai and Daimler-Chrysler was settled out of court in 2006.

Products

Trucks
Bering LD (Hyundai Mighty)
 Bering LD15—class 4 truck with Detroit Diesel 638 engine and Allison automatic transmission
Bering MD (modern super truck - Hyundai Mega Truck)
 Bering MD23 and MD26—class 6 truck with Cummins ISB engine
Bering HDMX (Hyundai New Power Truck)— Concrete mixer truck with Cat C12 engine and Eaton transmission

Other

 Industrial Engines
 Truck Chassis
 Bus chassis

References

Defunct truck manufacturers of the United States
Defunct bus manufacturers of the United States
Front Royal, Virginia
Defunct manufacturing companies based in Virginia
Vehicle manufacturing companies established in 1997